Willow Fong is a Tongan born, former international lawn bowls competitor for Fiji and Australia.

Biography
Fong is originally from Tonga and started bowling in 1974. 

Fong won the pairs silver medal with Maraia Lum On at the 1981 World Outdoor Bowls Championship in Toronto, Canada and four years later won the pairs silver medal again at the 1985 World Outdoor Bowls Championship in Melbourne, Australia. In 1998 she represented Australia at the Commonwealth Games and won a bronze medal in the pairs with Gordana Baric. 

She was the joint flag bearer for Fiji at the opening ceremony of the 1986 Commonwealth Games in Edinburgh, Scotland. 

She has won nine medals at the Asia Pacific Bowls Championships including five gold medals.

She now bowls in Australia for the Merrylands Bowling Club and is the wife of male bowls international Peter Fong.

References

Date of birth unknown
Fijian female bowls players
Australian female bowls players
Bowls players at the 1986 Commonwealth Games
Commonwealth Games competitors for Fiji
Bowls players at the 1998 Commonwealth Games
Commonwealth Games bronze medallists for Australia
Commonwealth Games medallists in lawn bowls
Medallists at the 1998 Commonwealth Games